Admiral Edwards may refer to:

Edward Edwards (Royal Navy officer) (1927–2014), British Royal Navy admiral
Phillip Edwards (Royal Navy officer) (1927–2014), British Royal Navy rear admiral
Ralph Edwards (Royal Navy officer) (1901–1963), British Royal Navy admiral
Richard Edwards (Royal Navy officer, died 1773), British Royal Navy rear admiral
Richard Edwards (Royal Navy officer, died 1795) (c. 1715–1795), British Royal Navy admiral
Richard S. Edwards (1885–1956), U.S. Navy admiral
Ronald A. Edwards (1923–2014), South African Navy vice admiral
Sampson Edwards (c. 1744–1840), British Royal Navy admiral